The bombesin receptors are a group of G-protein coupled receptors which bind bombesin.

Three bombesin receptors are currently known:
BB1, previously known as Neuromedin B receptor 
BB2, previously known as Gastrin-releasing peptide receptor 
BB3, previously known as Bombesin-like receptor 3

External links
 

G protein-coupled receptors